Werner Voigt (born 26 June 1947) is a German football coach and former player.

Voigt joined the youth department of SC Dynamo Berlin in 1964. One of his youth coaches was former East German national Herbert Schoen. Voigt eventually made his first appearance with the first team of BFC Dynamo in the second round of the 1967-68 FDGB-Pokal against HFC Chemie on 26 December 1967. 
He then made 10 appearances for BFC Dynamo in the 1967-68 DDR-Liga Nord.

Voigt made his debut for BFC Dynamo in the DDR-Oberliga against F.C. Hansa Rostock in the fourth matchday of the 1968-69 DDR-Oberliga on 7 September 1968. He would make a number of appearances for BFC Dynamo in the DDR-Oberliga in the following seasons. Voigt was then transferred to sports community FSG Dynamo Frankfurt in 1969. FSG Dynamo Frankfurt played in the third tier Bezirksliga at the time.

Voigt returned to BFC Dynamo in 1970, where he joined the reserve team BFC Dynamo II in the second tier DDR-Liga. He would also make a number of appearances with the first team in the 1970-71 DDR-Oberliga. Voigt was then registered in squad of the first team for thre 1971-72 sesson, but would only make two appearances in the 1971-72 DDR-Oberliga. He was transferred back to the reserve team BFC Dynamo II in 1972. However, he would again make a number of appearances with the first team in the 1972-73 DDR-Oberliga.

Voigt was eventually transferred to 1. FC Union Berlin in 1973. 1. FC Union Berlin played in the second tier DDR-Liga at the time. Voigt played 61 league- and cupmatches for 1. FC Union Berlin, before he was transferred to SG Dynamo Fürstenwalde in 1975. Voigt played for SG Dynamo Fürstenwalde in the second tier DDR-Liga, before he again returned to BFC Dynamo in 1976. He eventually retired as a player in 1977. Voigt had played numerous matches for the reserve team BFC Dynamo II during his career, but he had also played a total of 25 matches and scored 2 goals for BFC Dynamo in the first tier DDR-Oberliga.

After retiring as a player he became a certified sports teacher and worked as a youth coch at BFC Dynamo. Voigt would be one of the coaches responsible for the training of the future star Andreas Thom. He became the coach of Thom when Thom was 11 years old. Voigt commented on being the coach of young talent Thom, saying: "We won everything with him and Thomas Grether".

Voigt eventually succeeded Herbert Schoen as the coach of BFC Dynamo in The Next Generation Oberliga (de) in 1981. The reserve teams of the 14 DDR-Oberliga clubs had no longer been allowed to participate in the second tier DDR-Liga after the 1975–76 season. The Next Generation Oberliga was introduced instad. The team of BFC Dynamo under Voigt finished the 1982-83 Next Generation Oberliga as runner-up.

The Next Generation Oberliga was disbanded after the 1982–83 season. All teams were instead assigned to the third tier Bezirksliga. BFC Dynamo joined 1983-84 Bezirksliga Berlin with reseve team BFC Dynamo II. BFC Dynamo II under Voigt finished the 1983-84 Bezirksliga Berlin in first place and won promotion to the DDR-Liga. Voigt successfully led the reserve team in the DDR-Liga. BFC Dynamo II became a top team in the second tier DDR-Liga under Voigt and eventually won the 1985–86 DDR-Liga Staffel A.

Voigt became the coach of F.C. Hansa Rostock in 1986. Voigt led F.C. Hansa Rostock back to the DDR-Oberliga in 1987, a final in the FDGB-Pokal in 1989 and  participation in the UEFA Cup in 1989. He was replaced by Uwe Reinders in 1990. The club wanted a coach from West Germany. Reinders continued to build on Voigt's work. F.C. Hansa Rostock eventually became East German champions in the 1990–91 season.

His 70th birthday in 2017 was celebrated by both BFC Dynamo and 1. FC Union Berlin. Voigt spent a total of 22 years at BFC Dynamo.

Explanatory notes

References

1947 births
Living people
People from Dahme-Spreewald
East German footballers
Berliner FC Dynamo players
1. FC Union Berlin players
East German football managers
German football managers
FC Hansa Rostock managers
1. FC Union Berlin managers
Berliner FC Dynamo managers
Dynamo Dresden managers
DDR-Oberliga players
Association football midfielders
FSV Union Fürstenwalde players
Footballers from Brandenburg
People from Bezirk Potsdam